The Deans Trophy is the highest award in the Fiji Secondary Schools Rugby Union. The annual competition was introduced in 1939 and is the oldest tournament in the Fiji rugby union. The trophy was first won by Queen Victoria School and the current champion is Marist Brothers High School (MBHS).

History 
RKS shared the championship with Suva Grammar School in 2005.

Queen Victoria School won the Deans Trophy 23 times and drawn 6 times. It won the trophy in the Under 18 age group in 2011. The Queen Victoria School Dream Team retained the Deans Trophy in 2012 undefeated from Under 14 in 2008 till Under 18 in 2012. In 2019, QVS has won the Dean's trophy for a record 23 times after they defeated favorites and neighbors Ratu Kadavulevu School (RKS) in the final.

In 2011 the decision was made to lower the Deans Trophy Competition from Under 19 to Under 18. Hopes for the RKS U14 2006 dream team was shattered by this executive decision, after winning all their finals including the 2011 U19 but did not get to take the Title Trophy.

Ratu Kadavulevu School (RKS) have also won the trophy 22 times and drawn 5 times. RKS first won the trophy in 1961. RKS holds the record for the longest defense of the Deans Trophy from 1980 to 1985. RKS again won the Deans Trophy in 2015. In the 2017 Competition, RKS became the first school to win all 6 trophies on offer.

Lelean Memorial School (LMS) has won the trophy 14 times and drawn five times. Lelean first won the Deans Trophy in 1944. Lelean last won the Deans Trophy in 2014. Lelean set a record in 1955 by winning all 4 trophies on offer or the Bantam Grades (weight) which were, the Donnelly Cup for the Midget Grade, Russel Shield for the Junior Grade, the Tomling Cup for the Intermediate, and the Deans Trophy for the Senior Grade. However, this record has been superseded by Ratu Kadavulevu School in 2017 who won all grades age-wise (Under-14 to Under-19 trophies).

Marist Brothers High School won the Deans Trophy on 5 occasions and drew twice. They first won was in 1965. 
 
Latter Day Saints (LDS) College, Nasinu Teachers' College, Navuso Agricultural College, and Suva Grammar School (SGS) each won the trophy once. Provincial School Eastern (now RKS) have won the trophy twice.

Ratu Navula College, a school from Nadi in the Western Division of Fiji's main island, Viti Levu, won the trophy in the 2013 Fiji Secondary Schools Rugby Union Coke Zero Deans Competition. Ratu Navula College's Dream Team was undefeated from the Under 15 grade in 2010 right up to the Under 18 Grade in 2013.

List of past winners

See also
Under 14-under 19 grades score RKS

References
 RKS wins DEANS TITLE, 15 August 2015
 History, 17 August 2014
 Lelean Makes Dean History, Fiji Times Article, 22 August 2010
 Fiji Sun Editorial, 21 August 2010
 Motivation for RKS, Fiji Times Article, 18 August 2010
 The Deans goes home to Davuilevu, Sunday Times article, 17 August 2008
 John Wesley in Deans Trophy finals, Fiji Times article, 19 July 2010
 Lelean Sing the Blues, Fiji Times Article, 24 August 2009
 Lelean Win Deans for Rev Hunt, Fiji Times Report, 17 August 2008
 Legacy of the Deans Trophy, Fiji Times article, 18 August 2007
 End of the Deans' Road, Fiji Times Article, 20 August 2007
 Gutsiest Gladiators Gain Greatest Glory, Fiji Times Report, 18 August 2007

Rugby union competitions in Fiji